Andrew Jose Suárez (born September 11, 1992) is an American professional baseball pitcher in the St. Louis Cardinals organization. He has previously played in Major League Baseball (MLB) for the San Francisco Giants, and in the KBO League for the LG Twins. The Giants selected Suarez in the second round of the 2015 MLB draft. He made his MLB debut in 2018.

Amateur career
Suarez attended Christopher Columbus High School in Miami, Florida.  In 2010, he had a 5–1 win–loss record with a 1.51 earned run average (ERA), and was named First Team All-Dade County and FHSAA Class 6-A Pitcher of the Year. In 2011 he was 5–3 with a 1.65 ERA and 58 strikeouts in 34 innings pitched, and was All-Dade County First Team and an AFLAC All-American.

The Toronto Blue Jays selected Suarez in the ninth round of the 2011 MLB draft. He did not sign, and enrolled at the University of Miami to play college baseball for the Miami Hurricanes baseball team. As a Hurricane, Suarez became a top prospect. The Washington Nationals selected Suarez in the second round, with the 57th overall selection, of the 2014 MLB draft. He chose to return to Miami for his senior year, in order to earn his degree and attempt to improve his draft status for 2015.

Professional career

San Francisco Giants
The San Francisco Giants selected Suarez in the second round, with the 61st overall selection, of the 2015 MLB draft. Suarez signed with the Giants for a signing bonus of $1,010,100, and made three appearances with the Arizona Giants of the Rookie-level Arizona League before he was promoted to the Salem-Keizer Volcanoes of the Class A-Short Season Northwest League. In August, the Giants promoted Suarez to the San Jose Giants of the Class A-Advanced California League. In 39.1 total innings pitched between the three teams, he posted a 2–0 record and 1.60 ERA.

Suarez began the 2016 season in San Jose, and was promoted to the Richmond Flying Squirrels of the Class AA Eastern League; he finished the season with a combined 9–8 record and 3.63 ERA in 24 total games started between both teams. In 2017, he started the season with Richmond, and was promoted to the Sacramento River Cats of the Class AAA Pacific Coast League. In 26 total games (24 starts) between Richmond and Sacramento, Suarez pitched to a 10–10 record and 3.30 ERA with a 1.34 WHIP.

The Giants invited Suarez to spring training as a non-roster player in 2018. The Giants promoted Suarez to the major leagues on April 11, 2018, and he made his debut that same night at AT&T Park against the Arizona Diamondbacks. He started the game and pitched 5.1 innings, giving up four earned runs on four hits along with striking out seven and walking none; he received a loss as Arizona defeated the Giants 7–3. In 2018 with Sacramento and San Jose he was 2–0 with a 1.16 ERA in four starts. In 2018 with the Giants he was 7–13	with a 4.49 ERA, as in 29 starts he pitched 160.1 innings.

In 2019 with Sacramento he was 7–6 with a 5.73 ERA in 18 games (15 starts) in which he pitched 88 innings. That season with the Giants he was 0–2 with a 5.79 ERA, as in 21 games (2 starts) he pitched 32.2 innings.

LG Twins
On January 4, 2021, the Giants sold Suarez's rights to the LG Twins of the KBO League. That same day, he signed a one-year $600,000 deal with the Twins. Suarez made 23 appearances for the Twins, posting a 2.18 ERA and 126 strikeouts. He became a free agent following the season.

Tokyo Yakult Swallows
On December 20, 2021, Suarez signed with the Tokyo Yakult Swallows of Nippon Professional Baseball. In 2022, Suarez made 6 appearances for the Swallows, struggling to 6.23 ERA with 16 strikeouts in 21.2 innings pitched. He became a free agent after the 2022 season.

St. Louis Cardinals
On January 27, 2023, Suarez signed a minor league contract with the St. Louis Cardinals organization.

References

External links

1992 births
Living people
Baseball players from Miami
Major League Baseball pitchers
American expatriate baseball players in South Korea
San Francisco Giants players
Miami Hurricanes baseball players
Arizona League Giants players
Salem-Keizer Volcanoes players
San Jose Giants players
Richmond Flying Squirrels players
Sacramento River Cats players
LG Twins players
Christopher Columbus High School (Miami-Dade County, Florida) alumni